Leano or Leaño may refer to:

 Leano Morelli,  Italian singer-songwriter 
 Juan Carlos Leaño,  Mexican footballer
 María Scherman Leaño, Mexican politician